Didea, the lucent flies is a holarctic genus of black and yellow large sized flies . belonging to the hoverfly family of Diptera. The larvae feed on aboreal aphids.

Diagnosis
For terminology see Speight key to genera and glossary
This genus has an abdomen that is large, broad, flat, and strongly emarginated, having narrowly divided yellow, yellow-green, or pale green bands. The scutum is black and either shining or subshining. The notopleural callus and postsutural scutal margin of some specimens are obscurely yellowish, and the ventral scutellar fringe is short and sparse. The pleura is black with densely pale-pruinose areas on the upper half, and the anterior anepisternum is bare. The upper and lower katepisternal hair patches are broadly separated, the meron is bare, and the metepisternum and metasternum both have some hairs. The R 4+5 vein is moderately dipped into the cell r4+5, and the lower calypter has very few fine, pale, erect, and scattered hairs on the upper surface. There are several hairs at the posteromedial apical angle of the hind coxa.

Species
The following species are recognized:

References

Hoverfly genera
Taxa named by Pierre-Justin-Marie Macquart
Syrphinae
Syrphini